Pacifica High School may refer to:

 Pacifica High School (Garden Grove, California)
 Pacifica High School (Oxnard, California)
 Pacifica High School (West Pittsburg, California) (operated from 1955 to 1976)

See also 
 Pacifica Christian High School

References